Go! Go! Hypergrind is a skateboarding video game for the GameCube that was developed by Team Poponchi at Atlus Japan and published by Atlus USA.  It was released in North America on November 18, 2003. Animation studio Spümcø of Ren & Stimpy fame served as a collaborative art design firm for the game. Despite being developed in Japan, it has never been released there.

Plot
In the game, Spümcø is holding auditions in the "Toon World" for a new skateboarding cartoon called Go! Go! Hypergrind. In the Story Mode, the player choose one of the cartoon star hopefuls and attempt to impress Spümcø and pass the audition.

Gameplay
The game allows players to select one of several wacky cartoon characters and skateboard through a variety of cel-shaded levels. The objective of the game is to steer characters into a variety of classic cartoon "mishaps" (usually involving inflicting pain on the character in some way) and then chaining one mishap directly into another to create combos.

There is also a versus mode offering five different game types, which can be played with two players or against the computer.

Reception
Go! Go! Hypergrind received "mixed" reviews according to the review aggregation website Metacritic, holding an average score of 67. GameSpot gave the game a 7.9 praising the humor and presentation, while IGN gave the game a 5.1 criticizing the skateboarding mechanics for its simplicity.

References

External links

2003 video games
Atlus games
GameCube games
GameCube-only games
North America-exclusive video games
Skateboarding video games
Spümcø
Video games developed in Japan
Video games scored by Yoshio Tsuru
Video games with cel-shaded animation
Multiplayer and single-player video games